Amselia is a genus of moths of the family Crambidae. It was established in 1959 by Stanisław Błeszyński.

Species
Amselia heringi (Amsel, 1935)
Amselia leucozonellus (Walsingham & Hampson, 1896)

References

Crambinae
Crambidae genera
Taxa named by Stanisław Błeszyński